Sorkol is a salt lake in the Sarysu District, Jambyl Region, Kazakhstan.

The surrounding area is used as a grazing ground for local cattle throughout the year.

Geography
Sorkol lies in the lower Chu river basin. Its eastern shores are somewhat steep and the western are low and flat.

The area to the north and northwest of the lake gets flooded seasonally. Sorkol freezes at the end of November and thaws in March. On average the  water level rises right after the melting of the snows in the spring and decreases in the summer.

See also
List of lakes of Kazakhstan
Sor (geomorphology)

References

External links
Chu-Talas, Kazakhstan

Lakes of Kazakhstan
Jambyl Region
Chu (river)